Vinylbital, also known as butylvinal, is a sedative hypnotic drug which is a barbiturate derivative. It was developed by Aktiebolaget Pharmacia in the 1950s.

References 

Barbiturates
Sedatives
GABAA receptor positive allosteric modulators
Vinyl compounds